Alexander Armah Jr. (born May 17, 1994) is an American football fullback for the Washington Commanders of the National Football League (NFL). He played college football at West Georgia and was selected by the Carolina Panthers in sixth round of the 2017 NFL Draft. Armah has also been a member of the New Orleans Saints and Washington Football Team.

Early years
Armah attended and played high school football at Dacula High School in Dacula, Georgia. Armah attended and played college football at the University of West Georgia.

Professional career

Carolina Panthers
Armah was drafted by the Carolina Panthers in the sixth round, 192nd overall, in the 2017 NFL Draft. He was waived by the Panthers on September 3, 2017 and was signed to the practice squad the next day. He played in nine games his rookie season, and did not record any statistics. For the 2018 season, he survived training camp roster cuts and was named to the active roster. He made his 2018 debut in the season opener against the Dallas Cowboys. In the 16–8 victory, he scored his first career touchdown on a one-yard rush on his lone carry. On November 4, 2018, Armah scored his second career touchdown against the Tampa Bay Buccaneers. He appeared in all 16 games for 2018 season, mainly used as a blocking fullback and a special teamer. In the 2019 season, he appeared in all 16 games and recorded six carries for 11 rushing yards and one rushing touchdown.

New Orleans Saints
On March 19, 2021, Armah signed a one-year contract with the New Orleans Saints. He was released on August 31, 2021 and re-signed to the practice squad. He was promoted to the active roster on September 17, 2021. He was released on November 30.

Washington Football Team / Commanders
Armah signed with the practice squad of the Washington Football Team on December 2, 2021. On the Week 15 game against the Philadelphia Eagles, he was elevated to the active roster as a COVID-19 replacement player. He signed a reserve/future contract with Washington on January 11, 2022. Armah was placed on injured reserve on August 16, 2022, and released with an injury settlement a week later.

On October 19, 2022, Armah signed with Washington's practice squad. He signed a reserve/future contract on January 10, 2023.

Career statistics

References

External links
 
 Washington Commanders bio
 West Georgia Wolves bio

1994 births
Living people
People from Lawrenceville, Georgia
Sportspeople from the Atlanta metropolitan area
Players of American football from Georgia (U.S. state)
American football defensive ends
American football fullbacks
West Georgia Wolves football players
Carolina Panthers players
New Orleans Saints players
Washington Commanders players
Washington Football Team players